Thomas Forrester (June 1864 – ?) was an English footballer who played for Ardwick and Stoke.

Career
Forrester played for Trentham before he joined Stoke in 1888. He was a member of Stoke's reserve side the 'Swifts' and was overlooked by manager Harry Lockett for the first team. His only senior appearance came in the FA Cup against Warwick County. Stoke lost and most of the reserve players including Forrester were released. He later went on to play for Stoke St Peter's.

From there he joined Ardwick on 5 October 1892. He made his Football League debut on 26 November 1892 against Burton Swifts and went on to score twice in 10 appearances for Ardwick.

Career statistics

References

English footballers
Manchester City F.C. players
Stoke City F.C. players
1864 births
Year of death missing
Association football forwards